Godogani is a village in Martvili Municipality, Samegrelo-Zemo Svaneti, in western Georgia. It is located on the Odishi-Guria plain, on the left bank of the river Ochkhomuri,  from Martvili.

References

Populated places in Samegrelo-Zemo Svaneti
Kutaisi Governorate